Tropidophis wrighti, commonly known as Wright's dwarf boa, the gracile banded dwarf boa, and the gracile banded trope, is a species of snake in the family Tropidophiidae. The species is endemic to Cuba.

Etymology
T. wrighti is named after American botanist and explorer Charles Wright.

Geographic range
T. wrighti is found in eastern Cuba from Céspedes in Camagüey Province eastward to Santiago de Cuba in Santiago de Cuba Province.

Habitat
The preferred natural habitat of T. wrighti is forest, but it also can be found in coffee plantations and near houses.

Reproduction
T. wrighti is viviparous.

References

Further reading
Díaz LM, Cádiz A (2020). "A new species of Tropidophis (Squamata: Tropidophiidae) and molecular phylogeny of the Cuban radiation of the genus: una nueva especie de Tropidophis (Squamata: Tropidophiidae) y filogenia molecular de la radiación cubana del género". Novitates Caribaea 16: 1–19. (Tropidophis wrighti, pp. 1, 4, 5, Table I). (in English and Spanish).
Schwartz A, Henderson RW (1991). Amphibians and Reptiles of the West Indies: Descriptions, Distributions, and Natural History. Gainesville: University of Florida Press. 720 pp. . (Tropidophis wrighti, p. 643).
Stull OG (1928). "A Revision of the Genus Tropidophis ". Occasional Papers of the Museum of Zoology, University of Michigan (195): 1-49. (Tropidophis wrighti, new species, pp. 38–39).

Tropidophiidae
Reptiles described in 1928
Snakes of the Caribbean
Endemic fauna of Cuba
Reptiles of Cuba
Taxa named by Olive Griffith Stull